Andrew Thomas "Tom" Kearney (1892–1962) was the founder of Kearney, one of the world's oldest management consulting firms.

Biography
Andrew Thomas Kearney became part of James O. McKinsey's firm, McKinsey & Company, three years after it was founded in 1926. Kearney was McKinsey's first partner and head of its first office in Chicago. At the time, McKinsey & Company was one of the few firms that were focused on management consulting for top level executives rather than specialized consulting in areas such as accounting or law.

In 1937, McKinsey died unexpectedly at the age of 48 due to pneumonia. While the company continued to operate as before, Kearney and the remaining partners disagreed over how to run the firm. This led to a split in the company in 1939, which resulted in Kearney taking the Chicago office and renaming it "McKinsey, AT Kearney & Company". In 1947, Kearney sold his rights to the name "McKinsey" to Marvin Bower, and renamed his firm AT Kearney & Company. In 1961, Kearney retired and James Phelan became the managing partner of the firm. Kearney died on January 11, 1962.

According to Kearney: "Our success as consultants will depend upon the essential rightness of the advice we give and our capacity for convincing those in authority that it is good."

References

External links

1892 births
1962 deaths
American consultants
McKinsey & Company people
20th-century American businesspeople